Legion of Super Heroes is an American animated television series produced by Warner Bros. Animation, adapted from the DC Comics series of the same name. It debuted on September 23, 2006, and centers on a young Superman's adventures in the 31st century, fighting alongside the eponymous group of superheroes. The show was produced by one of its main character designers James Tucker, a co-producer of the Justice League Unlimited series, for the Kids' WB line on The CW network.

The series drew on the rich history of the Legion of Super-Heroes, taking inspiration from stories set during all time periods of the team's nearly 50-year history in comics. Continuity is internally consistent but is not shared with any previous incarnation of the Legion, either animated or in print. It also had its own tie-in spin-off comic book series that lasted 20 issues.

The series was cancelled after its second season.

Development history
A few months before Legion of Super Heroes premiered, the Legion appeared in the Justice League Unlimited episode "Far From Home." The episode featured Supergirl travelling to the future and joining the Legion, leading audiences to think that it was intended to serve as a back-door pilot establishing a premise for the Legion show, and that it would be a DCAU spinoff. However, series producer James Tucker clarified that Legion's show was deliberately created from scratch:

Let's get the myths out of the way. The Legion series was never tied to the Justice League Unlimited episode. Supergirl was never, ever going to be in the Legion. The true origin of the series came out of Cartoon Network's desire to have a Superman-centric series to premiere when the movie Superman Returns premiered. Superman as part of the Legion worked for them. So the series was originally developed for Cartoon Network, then they passed and Kids' WB! stepped in. They, too, wanted a Superman-centric series with Superman fresh out of Smallville, learning to be Superman. That's the reality.

Early reports had suggested the title of the series would be Superboy and the Legion of Super-Heroes, but the official announcement on April 24, 2006 confirmed the title as Legion of Super Heroes. The same announcement indicated that the series would air on the Kids' WB block of the new The CW network at 10 a.m.

Legal status/issues
At the 2006 Comic Con International, the production staff did not officially say whether legal issues at the time involving the ownership of Superboy had affected this series or whether changes were made to tie the series in with the Superman Returns film, but one significant change had been made since the announcement of the series. The original press release referred to "the young Superboy", while the revised press release, published in June 2006, described the character as a young Superman. At the conclusion of the pilot episode, Clark adopts the superhero name of Superman, and not Superboy. In the second season, which takes place two years after the end of the first season, the character is called Superman, without reference to his "young" status.

Second season
The second season has a much darker and more mature tone than the first season and mostly focuses on Brainiac 5 and his relationship with his evil ancestor, the original Brainiac. In the second season, most of the Legionnaires have changed their appearances, e.g., Lightning Lad has longer hair and gets a robotic arm. Their appearances change based on the two years without Superman after he left in the episode "Sundown Part 2", which is the finale of the first season. Triplicate Girl changes her codename to Duo Damsel because one of her bodies (the White Body) is lost in a temporal anomaly during one of their 41st Century's battles. The series logo was also slightly revised. As with the first season, a total of 13 episodes were created for the second season, which premiered on September 22, 2007. The show was not renewed for a third season.

Proposed third season
A third season had been planned for production but was dropped because the Kids' WB! slot was taken over by 4Kids. The third season was intended to take place three years after the end of the second season in which an older Superman would return. Sensor, Wildfire, Magnetic Kid, Supergirl, Tellus, Princess Projectra and Shadow Lass were to be introduced, while background characters Blok and Dawnstar would have active roles. Kell-El was intended to be a regular character but with a reduced role (with Wildfire planned to be his replacement). The main focus of the third season would have been Brainiac 5's return, while trying to redeem himself after the second season's finale and the evil Brainiac 6 trying to destroy the Legion. Also, producer James Tucker planned to make an episode adaptation of the story "The Ghost of Ferro Lad" to introduce Ferro Lad's long-lost twin brother. The final episode of season two linked the two seasons together.

Airings outside the U.S.

The first season of the series began airing on Cartoon Network UK on March 5, 2007. The 13 episodes were shown weekdays through March 21, and the two-part season finale aired in the UK about five weeks before it was shown in the US. It also used to air on CITV 'Action Stations' and re-aired on Cartoon Network Too.

 In Canada, the first season began airing on YTV on September 8, 2007. It continued to air through the second season of the show uninterrupted, before being taken off the air.
 In Australia, the first season began airing on Nine Network on August 9, 2009. The complete series was broadcast in widescreen.
 In Brazil, the first season began airing on Cartoon Network Brazil on March 1, 2008.
 In Italy, the first season began airing on Cartoon Network Italy on October 1, 2007.
 In the Philippines, the first season began airing on May 31, 2008, and the second season began airing on January 12, 2009, on Cartoon Network Philippines.
 In Bulgaria the show began airing on Nova Television on November 30, 2008.
 In Israel, the first season began airing on Children Channel on September 18, 2008.
 In the Netherlands, season one started airing on RTL 5 in March 2009.
 In Greece, the series aired in the summer of 2009 and 2010 on the Star Channel every weekday morning.
 In Trinidad and Tobago, the series aired on CCN TV6.

Characters

In the first season, the series revolved around a core group of eight Legionnaires but others appeared from time to time in recurring roles, similar in format to the Justice League Unlimited animated series.

Superman
The first season introduces a teenaged Clark Kent who is about to move from Smallville to Metropolis. He knows of his abilities but does not know what to do with his future (similar in nature to the Clark Kent featured in the Smallville television series). After travelling to the future, young Clark assumes the identity of Superman and gradually learns to control his abilities, becoming the hero he is destined to be. At the end of the first season, he returns to the present around the same time he left in the first episode.

In the second season, Superman returns to the future after spending two years in the past and gaining more experience with his powers. Also, a second Superman, called "Superman X", also appears in the second season. This Superman, later given the name Kell-El, is from the 41st century and was created from Superman's DNA and Kryptonite to be a living weapon with expanded abilities. His main foe in the 41st century is Imperiex, who travels through time to the 31st century, forcing Superman X to follow him into the past and recruit the Legion to help him.

Core Legionnaires
Series producer James Tucker offered descriptions of the core team in a July 2006 interview at Comic Con International in San Diego. As with other DC team shows such as Justice League Unlimited, not every core character appears in all episodes. The following descriptions apply to the characters as seen in the first season.

 Lightning Lad has lightning powers and is eager and hot-headed. The lightning bolt scar on his right eye sometimes flashes brightly in times of battle. He has a twin sister, Ayla, and an older brother, Mekt.
 Saturn Girl is a level-headed character with mental powers.
 Brainiac 5 is the smartest Legionnaire and can transform his robot body in various ways.
 Phantom Girl has the ability to pass through solid objects. She also has the ability to turn other people and objects temporarily intangible.
 Bouncing Boy is a friendly young "every man" who has the ability to make his body rubbery and springy. In Season 1, Bouncing Boy is elected leader of the Legionnaires.
 Triplicate Girl was born with the ability to split her form into three identical selves.
 Timber Wolf, named Brin Londo, is transformed into a werewolf-like creature as a result of his father's experiments on him. Brin has enhanced speed, strength, agility, and senses, but also has more feral emotional and physical tendencies.
 Chameleon Boy has the ability to shape shift all or part of his body into something else, animate or inanimate, as well as utilize the strength and power of what he transforms into. Appears as a regular in season two. His father, R.J. Brande, funds the Legion.

Other Legionnaires
XS appears in the final two episodes "Dark Victory" parts 1 and 2 as a background character. Dawnstar and Invisible Kid also appeared in these final two episodes along with many other rarely seen Legion members; however, none of the new members shown in these episodes did anything to the plot of the story itself.

In the first season, some Legionnaires were mentioned or shown as images before making an actual appearance. Fourteen members were shown during the season as already active: Blok, Bouncing Boy, Brainiac 5, Colossal Boy, Cosmic Boy, Dream Girl, Element Lad, Lightning Lad, Phantom Girl, Saturn Girl, Shrinking Violet, Sun Boy, Triplicate Girl, and Tyroc. Five more joined the Legion through the course of the series: Superman, Timber Wolf, Matter-Eater Lad, Star Boy, and Ferro Lad.

The opening credits sequences used for first-season episodes included a glimpse of the Mission Monitor Board signs for many Legionnaires as well as shots of flying Legionnaires who would be seen in later episodes (though not all of those with Mission Monitor Board symbols appeared). At least four members of the Legion as seen in the comics appeared in some way on the show but had not joined by the end of the first season (Ultra Boy, Lightning Lass, Wildfire, and Polar Boy).

In the second season, Karate Kid appeared in the opening credits with the other Legionnaires, though he did not appear until the fifth episode (in which Nemesis Kid also became a new member). Similar to Karate Kid, Sun Boy appeared in the second season opening titles and made semi-regular appearances but did not have a speaking line or have someone else refer to him by name. Ayla Ranzz, sister of Lightning Lad, finally made an appearance, but as a child without apparent super powers and not as the Light Lass of the comic books.

Cast

Legionnaires

Shadow Lass and Sensor were mentioned to appear in the third season, but were not actually in any of the two prior seasons.

Villains

Other characters

Episodes

Series overview

Season 1 (2006–07)

Season 2 (2007–08)

Awards and nominations

2006–2007 season
The series was nominated for three Creative Arts Emmy Awards, a subset of the Daytime Emmy Awards. None of the nominations won their category.
 Outstanding Achievement in Music Direction and Composition.
 Outstanding Achievement in Sound Editing – Live Action and Animation.
 Outstanding Achievement in Sound Mixing – Live Action and Animation.

Home video

Season 1 was released to home video in three separate DVD volumes, with four episodes on the first two releases and five on the third. The complete Season 1 collection was released in a 3-DVD box set, which merely collected each of the three individual volumes. All were released through Warner Home Video.

The complete Season 2 DVD collection was released in July 2020, at the same time as the entire series on Blu-Ray, through the Warner Archive Collection. Season 1 volume 1 has a bonus featurette called "We Are Legion", and the Season 2 two-part series finale has an audio commentary with producer James Tucker, director Brandon Vietti, and the voice of Saturn Girl, Kari Wahlgren. These bonus features are also included in the Complete Series Blu-Ray.

The series is also available for purchase or streaming on various platforms, including iTunes, Amazon Prime Video, and DC Universe.

Individual episodes have been released on various other DC home video releases; for example, the two-part episode "Dark Victory" was released an extra on the 4K Ultra HD/Blu-ray release of The Death of Superman.

Other media

Legion of Super Heroes in the 31st Century

A comic book based on the show's continuity was published under the title Legion of Super-Heroes in the 31st Century. According to the comic's writer, J. Torres, the name was chosen to distinguish itself from more specifically youth-oriented titles such as Justice League Adventures and Superman Adventures. The first issue was distributed during Free Comic Book Day 2007 in addition to being sold.

An interview concerning the Legion of Super Heroes in the 31st Century comic confirmed that the comic was to continue publication despite the series ending, and that the comic would also be telling stories that were to have taken place after the second-season finale. As of issue #20, the comic ceased publication.

Additional characters
While the comic incorporates the cast of the show, other characters from DC Comics have made an appearance.

 Arm Fall Off Boy – Legion of Super Heroes in the 31st Century #16
 Booster Gold – Legion of Super Heroes in the 31st Century #19
 Circe – Legion of Super Heroes in the 31st Century #7
 Bart Allen/Impulse – Legion of Super Heroes in the 31st Century #15
 Lex Luthor – Legion of Super Heroes in the 31st Century #13
 Lois Lane – Legion of Super Heroes in the 31st Century #13
 Perry White – Legion of Super Heroes in the 31st Century #13

Collected editions
Issues #1–7 were collected in the trade paperback Legion of Super Heroes in the 31st Century, Vol. 1: Tomorrow's Heroes (March 2008).

Merchandise
A tie-in promotion with McDonald's Happy Meal took place in August 2007. The Legion show was represented by eight figures (Superman, Timber Wolf, Lightning Lad, Mano, Tharok, Brainiac 5, Bouncing Boy, and Validus). As Happy Meal toys often have a "girl toy" and "boy toy", this set was aimed at the boys.

Action figures by Mattel were not produced because of a lack of retailer interest.

The collectible miniatures game HeroClix produced a special starter set of the Legion, including a figure of "Young Superman" during the first season.

References

External links
 Kids WB page
 DC page: TV series, comics
 .
 Legion of Super Heroes at The World's Finest

2000s American animated television series
2006 American television series debuts
2008 American television series endings
American children's animated action television series
American children's animated space adventure television series
American children's animated science fantasy television series
American children's animated superhero television series
English-language television shows
Kids' WB original shows
Animated Superman television series
The CW original programming
Animated television shows based on DC Comics
Teen animated television series
Teen superhero television series
Television series set in the future
Television series by Warner Bros. Animation
Hive minds in fiction
Television series set in the 4th millennium